Otto Kreisler (1890–1970) was an Austrian film director of the silent era. Kreisler was of Jewish background, and directed films with largely Jewish themes such as The Jewess of Toledo and Theodor Herzl, Standard-Bearer of the Jewish People. He was later forced to emigrate to Britain due to the Nazis.

Selected filmography
 Summer Idyll (1916)
 The Jewess of Toledo (1919)
 Maria Magdalena (1919)
 Wandering Jew (1920)
 Theodor Herzl (1921)
 Ludwig II (1922)

References

Bibliography
 Holmes, Deborah & Silverman, Lisa. Interwar Vienna: Culture Between Tradition and Modernity. Camden House, 2009.
 Dassanowsky, Robert. Austrian Cinema: A History. McFarland & Company Incorporated Pub, 2005.

External links

1890 births
1970 deaths
Austrian film producers
Austrian film directors
Film people from Vienna
Jewish emigrants from Austria to the United Kingdom after the Anschluss